Helga Haugland Byfuglien (born 22 June 1950 in Bergen) is a bishop in the Church of Norway. She was the Preses of the Norwegian Bishops' Conference from 2010 until her retirement in 2020. Prior to that, she was the Bishop of the Diocese of Borg.

She was appointed on 23 September 2005 by King Harald V, and was consecrated and installed in office on 11 December 2005 at Fredrikstad Cathedral. She held the position as Secretary General of the Norwegian YMCA-YWCA. She was the parish priest in Nidaros Diocese from 1978 to 1986 and in Ås parish in the Borg Diocese from 1986 to 1993. From 1993 till 1997 she was chaplain in the Borg Diocese.

References

Living people
1950 births
Bishops of Borg
Primates of the Church of Norway
Women Lutheran bishops